Henry Samuel Luito'o Fa'arodo Jr. (born 5 October 1982 in Honiara) is a former professional footballer from the Solomon Islands who played as a striker or a midfielder.

Club career 
Fa'arodo attended Nelson College from 2000 to 2001, playing for the school's football team as well as local club side Nelson Suburbs.

He is one of few Solomon Islanders who have played in Australian top-flight football for Perth Glory in the first A-League season and for the Melbourne Knights in the old NSL.

He joined Victorian Premier League side Altona Magic after a stint in New Zealand. In May 2010, he won the Oceania Champions League with Hekari United.

In January 2012, Fa'arodo linked up with Team Wellington in the ASB Premiership.

FC Nelson appointed Henry Fa'arodo as their junior technical advisor for the 2012 winter season and also played for the 1st team helping them to win the league.

International career 
He has frequently represented the Solomon Islands at international level, making his debut at the 2002 OFC Nations Cup against Tahiti. He played in 16 FIFA World Cup qualifying matches.

Henry was chosen as a starter on the Oceania All Stars team that faced the LA Galaxy on 6 December 2008 in New Zealand.

International goals
Scores and results list Solomon Islands' goal tally first.

Honours 

Hekari United
 OFC Champions League: 2009-10

Fawkner Blues
 Victorian Premier League minor premiers: 2002

Individual
Bill Fleming Medal: 2002

References

External links 
 
 
 Player profile – NZFC
 Player profile – Team Wellington

1982 births
Living people
People from Honiara
Solomon Islands footballers
Solomon Islands international footballers
Nelson Suburbs players
National Soccer League (Australia) players
Melbourne Knights FC players
A-League Men players
Perth Glory FC players
Auckland City FC players
Altona Magic SC players
Hekari United players
Team Wellington players
People educated at Nelson College
2002 OFC Nations Cup players
2004 OFC Nations Cup players
2012 OFC Nations Cup players
2016 OFC Nations Cup players
Solomon Islands expatriate footballers
Expatriate soccer players in Australia
Expatriate footballers in Papua New Guinea
Expatriate association footballers in New Zealand
Solomon Islands expatriate sportspeople in Australia
Solomon Islands expatriate sportspeople in Papua New Guinea
Solomon Islands expatriate sportspeople in New Zealand
Association football forwards
Association football midfielders
New Zealand Football Championship players